The IEEE Congress on Evolutionary Computation (CEC) is one of the largest and most important conferences within evolutionary computation (EC), the other conferences of similar importance being Genetic and Evolutionary Computation Conference (GECCO), Parallel Problem Solving from Nature (PPSN) and EvoStar (which comprises EuroGP, EvoApplications, EvoCOP, and EvoMUSART).

CEC, which is organized by the IEEE Computational Intelligence Society in cooperation with the Evolutionary Programming Society, covers most subtopics of EC, such as evolutionary robotics, multiobjective optimization, evolvable hardware, theory of evolutionary computation, and evolutionary design. Papers can also be found that deal with topics that are related to rather than part of EC, such ant colony optimization, swarm intelligence, and quantum computing.

The conference usually attracts several hundreds of attendees, as well as hundreds of papers.

External links
WCCI 2024, Yokohama, Japan
CEC 2023, Chicago, IL, USA
WCCI 2022, Padua, Italy
CEC 2021, Krakow, Poland (virtual)
WCCI 2020, Glasgow, UK (virtual due to COVID-19 pandemic)
CEC 2019, Wellington, New Zealand
WCCI 2018, Rio, Brazil
CEC 2017, San Sebastián, Spain
WCCI 2016, Vancouver, Canada
CEC 2015, Japan
WCCI 2014, China
CEC 2013, Cancún, Mexico
CEC 2012, Brisbane, Australia (part of  2012)
CEC 2011, New Orleans, LA, USA
CEC 2010, Barcelona, Spain (part of  2010)
CEC 2009, Trondheim, Norway
CEC 2008, Hong Kong (part of  2008)
CEC 2007, Singapore
CEC 2006, Vancouver, Canada (part of  2006)
CEC 2005, Edinburgh, UK
CEC 2004, Portland, OR, US
CEC 2003, Canberra, Australia
CEC 2002, Hawaii, US (part of  2002)
CEC 2001, Korea
CEC 2000, San Diego, CA, US
CEC 1999, Washington DC, US

Evolutionary computation